Reginald John Pickup (6 September 1929 – 19 July 2018) was an English footballer who played in the Football League for Stoke City.

Career
Pickup was born in Stoke-on-Trent and played amateur football with the Staffordshire Boy's Club before joining Stoke in 1949. He played one match in the Football League which came in a 0–0 draw at home to Huddersfield Town during the 1949–50 season. He then joined non-league Stafford Rangers.

Career statistics

References

1929 births
2018 deaths
English footballers
Stoke City F.C. players
Stafford Rangers F.C. players
English Football League players
Association football forwards
Footballers from Stoke-on-Trent